In Christian demonology, Belphegor (or Beelphegor,  Báʿal-pəʿór - Lord of the Gap) is a demon. In later Kabbalah Belphegor is a demon who helps people make discoveries. He seduces people by suggesting to them ingenious inventions that will make them rich, stagnating that which could not be accredited to it.

Auxiliary Bishop and witch-hunter Peter Binsfeld believed that Belphegor tempts by means of laziness. Also, according to Peter Binsfeld's Classification of Demons, Belphegor is the chief demon of the deadly sin known as Sloth in Christian tradition.

Literature
The 1409 Lollard manuscript titled Lanterne of Light associated Belphegor with the deadly sin of the gluttony.

The novella  by Italian diplomat Niccolò Machiavelli was first published in 1549, and regales how the demon comes to earth to find a mate.

Belphegor figures in Paradise Lost by John Milton, 1667. 

According to the 1818  by Collin de Plancy Belphegor was Hell's ambassador to France.  The same claim was repeated by Victor Hugo in Toilers of the Sea (1866).

In the grimoire Key of Solomon translated into English by S.L. Mathers in 1889, Belphegor is listed near the end of the book as an Assyrian idol, now destroyed.

The novella by Machiavelli became the basis for the opera Belfagor by Ottorino Respighi, which premiered at La Scala in Milan in 1923.

In popular culture
 The PZL M-15 Belphegor, a 1970s Polish utility aeroplane, was named after the demon, due to its strange look, the noise of its jet engine, and its unsuitability for crop dusting, for which it had been purpose-designed.
 Belphegor appears as a young human male in the first episode of the final season of the TV show Supernatural played by Alexander Calvert.
 Belphegor is a recurring demon/persona in the Megami Tensei and Persona video game series.
 Belphegor is the youngest demon brother in the otome game Obey Me. He appears as the avatar of sloth and the twin brother of Beelzebub.
 Belphegor is a blackened death metal band.
 Belphegor is the Storm Officer of the Varia in the anime and manga series Katekyo Hitman Reborn. He is also known as 'Prince the Ripper'.
Belphegor is the name one of the heretical gods, more specifically that of yellow luxin and sloth, in the Lightbringer saga by Brent Weeks.
 Belphegor is a random demon/monster encounter in the Square Enix game Final Fantasy IV.
 Belphegor is a young female demon in the series As Miss Beelzebub Likes. One of the main characters, and the love interest of Azazel.

References 

Baal
Demons in Christianity